Loving Annabelle is a 2006 American romantic drama film written and directed by Katherine Brooks. Inspired by Mädchen in Uniform, it tells the story of a boarding school student who falls in love with her teacher.

Plot
Annabelle Tillman, the worldly and emotionally mature 17 year-old daughter of a senator, is sent to Saint Theresa's, an all-girls Catholic boarding school after being expelled from two previous schools. Simone Bradley, a poetry teacher at the school, is in charge of her dormitory. Annabelle shares the dormitory with an amiable classmate, Kristen. She also shares her room with Catherine, who tends to bully people, and Colins, a student with a nervous disposition.

Simone is a dependable and respectable teacher who occasionally bends the rules out of concern for her students. Her personal life is synonymous with abiding by the conventions of society and her religion. Annabelle is her antiagent, with unrestrained behavior, unconventional choices and outright defiance of authority.

Annabelle receives a stern rebuke from the principal, Mother Immaculata, for audaciously flaunting her Buddhist prayer beads. Simone is given the responsibility of controlling her. At first, Simone requests that the principal move Annabelle to another dormitory but soon notices her maturity and sensitivity and convinces her to comply with the school regulations. In the process Annabelle falls in love with Simone.

Simone ignores Annabelle's delicate overtures until they are left alone at the school during spring break. Simone takes Annabelle on a day trip to her beach house, where Annabelle discovers painful details about Simone's past. Annabelle holds Simone tightly in her arms as Simone breaks down and a deep emotional connection is established between them.

Simone struggles within herself to resist Annabelle, but is eventually moved by her relentless pursuit. At the annual school dance, Annabelle goes up on stage with her guitar and sings a song she wrote for Simone. Simone runs outside, but Annabelle catches up with her. They kiss, then go to Simone's room and have sex.

The next morning, when Colins wonders were Annabelle was because she did not spend the night in her room, Catherine suspects what happened and out of spite tells Mother Immaculata to check on Annabelle and Simone. The clock alarm had not gone off and as they rush to get dressed, Mother Immaculata walks in on them and orders Simone to come to her office immediately. Upon being questioned if she had thought about the consequences beforehand, Simone admits that she loves Annabelle. Police detectives arrest Simone (for statutory rape or a similar crime) and just as she is leaving, Annabelle places her most prized possession — the Buddhist prayer beads — in Simone's hand.

Inside Simone's room, Annabelle tearfully looks at the photographs taken by her at the beach house as Simone, gazing serenely out the car window, is driven away. The film ends quoting Rainer Maria Rilke: "For one human being to love another that is perhaps the most difficult of all our tasks...the work for which all other work is but preparation."

Cast

 Erin Kelly as Annabelle Tillman, an openly lesbian young woman in love with her teacher, Simone Bradley
 Diane Gaidry as Simone Bradley, a closeted lesbian teacher who falls in love with her student, Annabelle
 Laura Breckenridge as Colins, a troubled girl who becomes Annabelle's friend
 Michelle Horn as Kristen, Catherine's best friend
 Gustine Fudickar as Catherine ("Cat"), a student who bullies her fellow pupils, especially Colins
 Ilene Graff as Mother Immaculata, Simone's aunt and school principal
 Markus Flanagan as Michael, Simone's ex-boyfriend
 Kevin McCarthy as Father Harris, the school priest

Filming

The school scenes were filmed at Marymount High School in Los Angeles, California.

Accolades
Atlanta Film Festival
 2006 Audience Award (Katherine Brooks)

Fort Worth Gay and Lesbian International Film Festival
 2006 Q Award- Narrative Feature (Katherine Brooks)

L.A. Outfest
 2006 Audience Award (Katherine Brooks)
 2006 Grand Jury Award- Best Actress (Diane Gaidry)

Long Island Film Festival
 2006 Audience Choice Award- Narrative Feature (Katherine Brooks)

Paris Cinema Festival
 2006 Jury Award (Katherine Brooks)

Home media
The DVD for Region 1 was released by Wolfe Video on December 12, 2006. The Region 2 DVD was released by TLA Releasing on January 14, 2008.

Alternate ending
The DVD contains an alternate ending in which Annabelle is driving on a coast highway to an unknown destination. She stops at a road-side store and picks up a copy of a newspaper with the front page headline  “No Charges To Be Filed In Teacher Student Sex Scandal”, and smiles. Annabelle is then seen with her car parked on the side of the road, and she rushes down the steps leading to Simone's beach house.

See also
 Bloomington (2010)
 List of LGBT-related films directed by women

References

Further reading

External links

  (archive)
 
  Loving Annabelle at Mongrel Media
  Loving Annabelle at Wolfe Video
 
 
 Loving Annabelle at Encyclopedia of Lesbian Movie Scenes

2006 films
2006 LGBT-related films
2006 romantic drama films
2000s American films
2000s English-language films
American independent films
American teen LGBT-related films
Films set in boarding schools
Films about scandalous teacher–student relationships
Juvenile sexuality in films
Lesbian-related films
LGBT-related coming-of-age films
LGBT-related romantic drama films
Films shot in Los Angeles